The Biak Island uromys or Biak giant rat (Uromys boeadii) is a species of rodent in the family Muridae. It is known only from a single specimen collected on the Indonesian island of Biak.

References

Uromys
Mammals of Western New Guinea
Mammals described in 1994
Taxa named by Colin Groves
Taxa named by Tim Flannery
Rodents of New Guinea